United Nations Security Council Resolution 439, adopted on November 13, 1978, after recalling resolutions 385 (1976), 431 (1978), 432 (1978) and 435 (1978), the Council condemned South Africa for its decision to proceed unilaterally with elections in Namibia in contravention of previous resolutions. The Council considered this a clear defiance of the authority of the United Nations.

Resolution 439 continued by stating that the results of elections held in South West Africa will be declared null and void and will not be recognised by the United Nations or any of its Member States. The Council demanded that South Africa cooperate with it and if not, will consider further action under Chapter VII of the United Nations Charter so as to ensure South Africa's compliance with the Security Council. The resolution also required the Secretary-General to report on the progress of the implementation of the resolution by November 25, 1978.

The resolution passed with 10 votes to none, while Canada, France, West Germany, the United Kingdom and United States abstained from voting.

See also
 List of United Nations Security Council Resolutions 401 to 500 (1971–1976)
 Namibian War of Independence
 South Africa under apartheid

References
Text of the Resolution at undocs.org

External links
 

 0439
1978 in Africa
 0439
 0439
November 1978 events